The Seven Cities of Gold is a strategy video game created by Danielle Bunten Berry (credited as Dan Bunten) and Ozark Softscape and published by Electronic Arts in 1984. The player takes the role of a late 15th-century explorer for the Spanish Empire, setting sail to the New World in order to explore the map and interact with the natives in order to win gold and please the Spanish court. The name derives from the "seven cities" of Quivira and Cíbola that were said to be located somewhere in the Southwest United States. It is considered to be one of the earliest open world video games.

Gameplay

The game begins with the player having been given an exploration fleet by the Spanish crown, consisting of four ships, one hundred men, and some trade goods. The game appears showing a city in Spain, a fairly simplified 2D side-scrolling representation of the town consisting of the player's home, a palace, a pub and an outfitters. The player can walk about the town with the joystick, walking into the buildings in order to interact with them via menus. For instance, walking into the outfitters will bring up a menu allowing the user to buy supplies, men and trade goods. Interaction in Spain is fairly limited; the player soon moves to the ships, at one end of the city map, to leave port.

Most of the game is played on a game screen with a small scrolling top-down map in the center and a number of status displays surrounding it. After leaving port the display switches to this map, and the player guides the ship to the New World. At any point the player can bring up a menu with contents based on the player's current location. For instance, if the menu is brought up while on the ship, the items allow you to view the map, or "drop stuff off", the later selection allowing exploration parties to be created by dropping off men and supplies from the ships. When the player is on land as part of an exploration party, the same menu item creates a fort when men are dropped off in it.

Upon arriving in the new world, the player can explore the coastline, set up missionaries and forts, and interact with the native peoples. Approaching the villages results in the map zooming in to show the village, represented by four buildings, and the natives moving about. In the center is the village chieftain, approaching him and opening the menu allows trade for gold and food. The player has the option to peacefully trade with or conquer the natives, and can (with the right choices and luck) sometimes convert them, turning the village into a mission.

The natives can be attacked simply by moving onto them. A few accidental killings is acceptable to the village, and sometimes unavoidable, but too many and the natives will become hostile and attack the party. In many cases, the Spanish can overwhelm the natives, who will eventually give up fighting and allow the Spanish to plunder the town. Ambushes are also common, between the towns.

Much of Seven Cities of Gold was influenced by historical accounts of the era. Interactions with the natives could be peaceful or hostile, or become hostile due to the language barrier. While it could be assumed that the goal of the game is to return with riches from the New World, there really are no goals at all. The game has no scoring system and provides the player with feedback from the King, but no interference, if they slaughter the natives. According to Bunten, from an interview in Antic:

The size of the New World was one of the concepts that was integrated into the design; the land had to be detailed and diverse. As a result, data storage and retrieval became a major issue, particularly as the developers did not want lengthy load times to interfere with the game. As described by Bunten, "Our only way out was to use technologies we didn't have until we were forced to invent them." The game used a streaming system to allow the map to be loaded in without interrupting game play. The game ships with a single "world" closely modeled on the real one, including details as small as the Florida Keys and most well-known rivers. The game also includes a world creating engine that allows the user to build a truly new New World, saving it to a user supplied disk.

Game maps include one or more "lost cities" that are hidden by a mountain icon in locations that are typically far from other land masses. Explorers that stumble on one of these hidden cities will be greeted with the message "Sir, we have discovered a lost city." Inhabitants of this type of village are docile and run from the player and when the chief of the village is approached, the game will inform the player that "We may take what we want as tribute!" and the user will be able to acquire a sizable amount of gold without having to trade.

Ports 
Bunten considered the Atari 8-bit family version of Seven Cities of Gold the only "full" version, while the others were ports of which Bunten said "we did the best we could with what we had". Versions for the Commodore 64 and Apple II were released soon after in the same year, followed by the Macintosh and Amiga in 1985 and IBM PC compatibles in 1987.

Reception 
In 1984, COMPUTE!s James V. Trunzo called Seven Cities "a riveting new adventure game ... a graphically enhanced strategy game that challenges and educates as well as entertain", and noted its ability to generate new maps. In 1985 Compute!'s Gazettes Gregg Keizer wrote that "this exceptional game" let him fulfill his childhood fantasy of exploring the Amazon: "Fantasies and worlds to explore. What more could you want?"

Seven Cities of Gold had sold over 100,000 copies by the time it won the "Strategy Game of the Year" award in Computer Gaming World'''s 1985 reader poll. In 1996, Computer Gaming World ranked Seven Cities of Gold as the 61st best game of all time, stating "Ozark Softscape's fantastic game of New World exploration offended some with its accurate treatment of autochthonous tribes."

ReviewsThe V.I.P. of Gaming Magazine #2 (Feb./March, 1986)
 Casus Belli #24 (Feb 1985)

 Legacy 
In 1993, a new version was released for the IBM PC. It is more a reconceptualization of the gameplay than as a simple cosmetic makeover. The game is set up as a tier of goals that must be accomplished. For example, the first goal is to establish one mission, one colony, and three forts in the space of ten voyages. Computer Gaming World in 1993 stated that the changes in the VGA remake of the game were improvements. The magazine concluded that "Seven Cities of Gold is still the fresh, simple, playable game that broke ground in the early days of computer gaming".Seven Cities of Gold, Commemorative Edition won the 1993 Origins Award for Best Military or Strategy Computer Game.

See also
 Heart of Africa'', a similar game from Ozark Softscape

References

External links 
The Seven Cities of Gold at MobyGames
The Seven Cities of Gold at Atari Mania

The Seven Cities of Gold at the Amiga Hall of Light
C64 package, manual, and screenshots
Review in GAMES Magazine

1984 video games
Amiga games
Age of Discovery video games
Apple II games
Ariolasoft games
Atari 8-bit family games
Commodore 64 games
Danielle Bunten Berry games
Electronic Arts games
Games commercially released with DOSBox
Classic Mac OS games
Open-world video games
Origins Award winners
Ozark Softscape games
Strategy video games
Trade simulation games
Video games developed in the United States
Single-player video games